Rose Island is an uninhabited island, and with an area of 121 hectares the fifth largest of the Auckland Islands group, a subantarctic chain that forms part of the New Zealand Outlying Islands.

It is located in the northeast of the group, in the mouth of Port Ross, Auckland Island and south west of the larger Enderby Island.  It was stocked with rabbits and provided with a boatshed for the relief of castaways during the nineteenth century.  The rabbits have since been eradicated by the Department of Conservation, and provides a secure home for a population of Auckland Islands teal. The vegetation on Rose contains rata, and while much original vegetation has been destroyed, it is less modified than much of the Auckland Islands.

See also

 Composite Antarctic Gazetteer
 SCAR
 Territorial claims in Antarctica
 New Zealand Subantarctic Islands
 List of Antarctic and subantarctic islands#List of subantarctic islands
 List of islands of New Zealand
 List of islands
 Desert island

References

Islands of the Auckland Islands
Uninhabited islands of New Zealand